The following is a list of armed conflicts with victims in 2017.

List guidelines 
Listed are the armed conflicts having done globally at least 100 victims and at least 1 victim during the year 2017.

10,000+ deaths in 2017
Conflicts in the following list have caused at least 10,000 direct violent deaths in 2017.

1,000–9,999 deaths in 2017
Conflicts in the following list have caused at least 1,000 and fewer than 10,000 direct violent deaths in 2017.Conflicts causing at least 1,000 deaths in one calendar year are considered wars by the Uppsala Conflict Data Program.

100–999 deaths in 2017
Conflicts in the following list have caused at least 100 and fewer than 1,000 direct violent deaths in 2017.

Fewer than 100 deaths in 2017
Conflicts in the following list have caused at least 1 and fewer than 100 direct violent deaths in 2017.

See also

References
Notes

Citations

2017
2017